LinuxDeploy is an application that allows the installation of Linux distributions on an Android device. However, the Android device has to be rooted first before being able to install this application.

See also 

 Comparison of OS emulation or virtualization apps on Android

References 

Android emulation software